Guremu Demboba (15 December 1934 – 22 February 2023) was an Ethiopian cyclist. He competed at the 1956 Summer Olympics and the 1960 Summer Olympics.

Demboba died in Addis Ababa on 22 February 2023, at the age of 88.

References

External links
 

1934 births
2023 deaths
20th-century Ethiopian people
Cyclists at the 1956 Summer Olympics
Cyclists at the 1960 Summer Olympics
Ethiopian male cyclists
Olympic cyclists of Ethiopia
Sportspeople from Addis Ababa